Merrimac is a village in Sauk County, Wisconsin, United States, northwest of Madison. The population was 420 at the 2010 census. The village is located within the Town of Merrimac.

It is the location of the Merrimac Ferry, a free ferry across the Wisconsin River operated by the state.

History
A post office called Merrimac was established in 1855. The village was named after the Merrimack River, in New England.

Geography
Merrimac is located at  (43.37391, -89.628857).

Demographics

2010 census
As of the census of 2010, there were 420 people, 185 households, and 123 families living in the village. The racial makeup of the village was 97.9% White, 0.2% African American, 0.7% from other races, and 1.2% from two or more races. Hispanic or Latino of any race were 3.1% of the population.

There were 185 households, of which 25.4% had children under the age of 18 living with them, 54.1% were married couples living together, 9.7% had a female householder with no husband present, 2.7% had a male householder with no wife present, and 33.5% were non-families. 23.8% of all households were made up of individuals, and 10.2% had someone living alone who was 65 years of age or older. The average household size was 2.27 and the average family size was 2.65.

The median age in the village was 48 years. 19% of residents were under the age of 18; 3.6% were between the ages of 18 and 24; 21.9% were from 25 to 44; 36.5% were from 45 to 64; and 19% were 65 years of age or older. The gender makeup of the village was 48.3% male and 51.7% female.

2000 census
As of the census of 2000, there were 416 people, 166 households, and 120 families living in the village. The population density was 547.9 people per square mile (211.3/km2). There were 218 housing units at an average density of 287.1 per square mile (110.8/km2). The racial makeup of the village was 96.88% White, 0.72% Black or African American, 0.24% Native American, 0.24% Asian, 1.20% from other races, and 0.72% from two or more races. 1.44% of the population were Hispanic or Latino of any race.

There were 166 households, out of which 31.9% had children under the age of 18 living with them, 59.6% were married couples living together, 9.0% had a female householder with no husband present, and 27.7% were non-families. 24.7% of all households were made up of individuals, and 9.6% had someone living alone who was 65 years of age or older. The average household size was 2.51 and the average family size was 2.91.

In the village, the population was spread out, with 24.8% under the age of 18, 5.5% from 18 to 24, 27.4% from 25 to 44, 26.0% from 45 to 64, and 16.3% who were 65 years of age or older. The median age was 41 years. For every 100 females, there were 91.7 males. For every 100 females age 18 and over, there were 95.6 males.

The median income for a household in the village was $41,250, and the median income for a family was $42,656. Males had a median income of $27,361 versus $25,357 for females. The per capita income for the village was $19,091. About 3.4% of families and 3.1% of the population were below the poverty line, including 2.8% of those under age 18 and 6.2% of those age 65 or over.

See also 
 Badger Army Ammunition Plant
 Durward's Glen, historic property
 List of villages in Wisconsin

References

External links

 

Villages in Wisconsin
Villages in Sauk County, Wisconsin
Piers in Wisconsin
Populated places established in 1855
1855 establishments in Wisconsin